Manchester Road railway station may refer to:

 Burnley Manchester Road railway station in Burnley, Lancashire, England
 Manchester Road railway station (West Yorkshire), a station in Bradford, England